Psychotica are an American industrial band, formed in 1994 by Pat Briggs and Tommy Salmorin with a band consisting of Paul Kostabi, cellist Enrique Tiru Velez, backing vocalist Reeka, and drummer Buz. They have released three albums. Psychotica are best known for their participation in the 1996 Lollapalooza tour which also included Soundgarden, the Ramones, the Screaming Trees and Metallica.

In 1998, Psychotica added guitarist Clint Walsh and released Espina. A tour with Jack Off Jill and Switchblade Symphony followed. Shortly after the tour, Briggs moved to Los Angeles. Briggs and Kostabi went in different directions and Psychotica disbanded.

In the summer of 2009, Briggs and Kostabi reunited to begin work on the fourth Psychotica album. Psychotica partnered with Christian Menses and his independent record label, Toxic Shock Records to re-release Pandemic.

On December 30, 2022, Psychotica's booking agency posted to Instagram that Patrick Briggs had died. Cause of death was not reported.

Discography
Psychotica (1996, Ventrue Entertainment/American Recordings) logo/cover designed by Stephen Sprouse
Espina (1998, Zero Hour Records)
Thorn (2004, Art Monkey Records) (Expanded reissue of Espina)
Pandemic (2003, Art Monkey Records) (Previously unreleased 1999 album for Red Ant Records)
Pandemic Re-Release (2008, Toxic Shock Records)
Psychotica Acoustic (2009, Psychotica Records) (Digital only release)
I Will Survive EP (2009, Toxic Shock Records)
Black Dahlia EP (2010, Toxic Shock Records)
All The Broken Souls & Pandemic (2018, Wanker Records)

References

External links

 
 

Official Myspace Page
Interview with Psychotica in Absenta Musical
Wiltz, Teresa (October 4, 1996). "Psychotica is Certainly Prone to Rock Theatrics". Chicago Tribune. 
History of Psychotica by Elizabeth V. Bouras

American industrial music groups
Musical groups from New York City
Musical groups established in 1994
Zero Hour Records artists